Pascal Bernabé is a French scuba diver who in 2005 laid claim to the world best for depth on a deep dive using self-contained breathing apparatus. Bernabé claimed to have reached a maximum depth of  using trimix on 5 June 2005 near Propriano, Corsica. This was actually deeper than the official deepest scuba dive recognized by Guinness World Records at the time. However, Bernabé's claimed deepest dive was not included in the Guinness Book of World Records due to insufficient evidence of such a dive ever being performed.

Ahmed's record was verified by Guinness World Records.

See also

 World's deepest SCUBA dives

References

Sources
 Pascal Bernabé official site (French)

1964 births
Living people
French underwater divers
Place of birth missing (living people)